Jaclyn Lora Crandall (born April 4, 1989), previously known as Jaclyn Tingley, is a Canadian curler from Fredericton, New Brunswick. She currently skips her own team out of the Capital Winter Club.

Career
Crandall played in her first provincial championship during the 2009–10 season as third for Ashley Howard. The team made it to the final of the 2010 New Brunswick Scotties Tournament of Hearts, where they lost to Andrea Crawford 8–5. The team won the 2010 Lady Monctonian Invitational Spiel to start the 2010–11 season. They would however not qualify at provincials that year, finishing the round robin with a 2–5 record. After the season, Tingley joined the Melissa Adams rink. The team qualified for the provincial final at the 2013 New Brunswick Scotties Tournament of Hearts, where they would lose to the Crawford rink 13–6.

Crandall made her first national appearance at the 2014 CIS/CCA Curling Championships playing as third for Jennifer Armstrong. The team finished in last place with a 1–6 record.

After taking a few seasons off, Crandall joined the Sylvie Quillian rink as their alternate for the 2018–19 season. Team Quillian qualified for the playoffs at both the 2019 and 2020 provincial championships, losing in the semifinal in 2019 and final in 2020. After the 2019–20 season, Quillian joined the Andrea Crawford team and Melissa Adams took over as skip of the team with Crandall moving up to second. Due to the COVID-19 pandemic in New Brunswick, the 2021 provincial championship was cancelled. As the reigning provincial champions, Team Crawford was given the invitation to represent New Brunswick at the 2021 Scotties Tournament of Hearts, but they declined due to work and family commitments. Team Adams was then invited in their place, which they accepted. One member of Team Adams, Justine Comeau, opted to not attend the Scotties, with Nicole Arsenault Bishop stepping in to play second on the team. At the Hearts, they finished with a 3–5 round robin record, failing to qualify for the championship round.

Personal life
Crandall is employed as a teacher with the Anglophone West School District. She has a son, Adam.  She graduated from the University of New Brunswick.

Teams

References

External links

1989 births
Canadian women curlers
Living people
Curlers from New Brunswick
University of New Brunswick alumni
Sportspeople from Fredericton